Baylor University is a private Baptist Christian research university in Waco, Texas. Baylor was chartered in 1845 by the last Congress of the Republic of Texas. Baylor is the oldest continuously operating university in Texas and one of the first educational institutions west of the Mississippi River in the United States. Located on the banks of the Brazos River next to I-35, between the Dallas–Fort Worth Metroplex and Austin, the university's  campus is the largest Baptist university in the world. As of fall, 2021, Baylor had a total enrollment of 20,626 (undergraduate 15,191, graduate 5,435). It is classified among "R1: Doctoral Universities – Very High Research Activity". The university grants undergraduate and graduate degrees, including doctoral and professional degrees.

Baylor University's athletic teams, known as the Bears, participate in 19 intercollegiate sports. The university is a member of the Big 12 Conference in the NCAA Division I.

History

In 1841, 35 delegates to the Union Baptist Association meeting voted to adopt the suggestion of the Rev. William Milton Tryon and R. E. B. Baylor to establish a Baptist university in Texas, then an independent republic. Baylor, a Texas district judge and onetime U.S. Congressman and soldier from Alabama, became the school's namesake. Some at first wished to name the new university "San Jacinto" to recognize the victory which enabled the Texans to become an independent nation, then before the final vote of the Congress, the petitioners requested the university be named in honor of Baylor.

In fall 1844, the Texas Baptist Education Society petitioned the Congress of the Republic of Texas to charter a Baptist university. Republic President Anson Jones signed the Act of Congress on February 1, 1845, officially establishing Baylor University. The founders built the original university campus in Independence, Texas. The Rev. James Huckins, the first Southern Baptist missionary to Texas, was Baylor's first full-time fundraiser. He is considered the third founding father of the university. Although these three men are credited as being the founders of the university, many others worked to see the first university established in Texas and thus they were awarded Baylor's Founders Medal. The noted Texas revolutionary war leader and hero Sam Houston gave the first $5,000 donation to start the university. In 1854, Houston was also baptized by the Rev. Rufus Columbus Burleson, future Baylor president, in the Brazos River.

During the 1846 school year Baylor leaders would begin including chapel as part of the Baylor educational experience. The tradition continues today and has been a part of the life of students for over 160 years. In 1849, R. E. B. Baylor and Abner S. Lipscomb of the Texas Supreme Court began teaching classes in the "science of law," making Baylor the first in Texas and the second university west of the Mississippi to teach law. During this time Stephen Decatur Rowe would earn the first degree awarded by Baylor. He would be followed by the first female graduate, Mary Kavanaugh Gentry, in 1855.

In 1851, Baylor's second president, Rufus Columbus Burleson, decided to separate the students by sex, making the Baylor Female College an independent and separate institution. Baylor University became an all-male institution. During this time, Baylor thrived as the only university west of the Mississippi offering instruction in law, mathematics, and medicine. At the time a Baylor education cost around $8–$15 per term for tuition. And many of the early leaders of the Republic of Texas, such as Sam Houston, would later send their children to Baylor to be educated. Some of those early students were Temple Lea Houston, son of President Sam Houston, a famous western gun-fighter and attorney; and Lawrence Sullivan "Sul" Ross famous Confederate general and later President of Texas A&M University.

For the first half of the American Civil War, the Baylor president was George Washington Baines, maternal great-grandfather of the future U.S. President, Lyndon B. Johnson. He worked vigorously to sustain the university during the Civil War, when male students left their studies to enlist in the Confederate Army. Following the war, the city of Independence slowly declined, primarily caused by the rise of neighboring cities being serviced by the Santa Fe Railroad. Because Independence lacked a railroad line, university fathers began searching for a location to build a new campus.

Beginning in 1885, Baylor University moved to Waco, Texas, a growing town on the railroad line. It merged with a local college called Waco University. At the time, Burleson, Baylor's second president, was serving as the local college's president. That same year, the Baylor Female College also was moved to a new location, Belton, Texas. It later became known as the University of Mary Hardin-Baylor. A Baylor College Park still exists in Independence in memory of the college's history there. Around 1887, Baylor University began readmitting women and became coeducational again.

In the 1890s, William Cowper Brann published the highly successful Iconoclast newspaper in Waco. One of his targets was Baylor University. Brann revealed Baylor officials had been importing South American children recruited by missionaries and making house-servants out of them. Brann was shot in the back by Tom Davis, a Baylor supporter. Brann then wheeled, drew his pistol, and killed Davis. Brann was helped home by his friends, and died there of his wounds.

In 1900, three physicians founded the University of Dallas Medical Department in Dallas, although a university by that name did not exist. In 1903, Baylor University acquired the medical school, which became known as the Baylor College of Medicine, while remaining in Dallas. In 1943, Dallas civic leaders offered to build larger facilities for the university in a new medical center if the College of Medicine would surrender its denominational alliances with the Baptist state convention. The Baylor administration refused the offer and, with funding from the M. D. Anderson Foundation and others, moved the College of Medicine to Houston. In 1969, the Baylor College of Medicine became technically independent from Baylor University. The two institutions still maintain strong links and Baylor still elects around 25 percent of the medical school's regents. They also share academic links and combine in research efforts.

During World War II, Baylor was one of 131 colleges and universities nationally that took part in the V-12 Navy College Training Program which offered students a path to a Navy commission.

The university first admitted black students in 1964. The first black graduate was Robert Gilbert, of Waco. 

In 1991, Baylor began appointing the majority of its board, granting it partial independence from the Baptist General Convention of Texas.

A ban on various forms of sexual conduct including "homosexual acts" was in place until 2015, however, the university has since modified its Code of Conduct. As of 2021 the university prohibits LGBT student groups and is opposed to gay marriage.

In 2021, Baylor released an independent historical report acknowledging past slave ownership and support for the Confederacy by R. E. B. Baylor and two founders. These facts were not previously acknowledged by the university.

2010s sexual assault scandal

In 2015 the Baylor Board of Regents hired law firm Pepper Hamilton to perform an external review of Baylor's handling of sexual assaults. The report, summarized by the board in a public "Findings of Facts" document, stated that Baylor failed to implement Title IX in a timely and effective manner, that Baylor administrators actively discouraged reporting of sexual assaults, and that the athletic department failed to address sexual assaults. In response to the report, the Board of Regents fired Ken Starr as president of the university but retained him as Chancellor and as a law school professor; he resigned as Chancellor shortly thereafter and resigned as law professor in August 2016. The school also fired head football coach Art Briles.

Presidents

During its more than 170 years of history, Baylor has had 15 presidents (recent interim presidents are noted):

1846–1851 – Henry Lee Graves
1851–1861 – Rufus Columbus Burleson
1861–1863 – George Washington Baines
1864–1885 – William Carey Crane
1885–1886 – Reddin Andrews
1886–1897 – Rufus Columbus Burleson
1899–1902 – Oscar Henry Cooper
1902–1931 – Samuel Palmer Brooks
1932–1947 – Pat Morris Neff
1948–1961 – William R. White
1961–1981 – Abner Vernon McCall
1981–1995 – Herbert H. Reynolds
1995–2005 – Robert B. Sloan Jr.
2005–2006 – William D. Underwood, interim president
2006–2008 – John M. Lilley
2008–2010 – David E. Garland, interim president
2010–2016 – Ken Starr
2016–2017 – David E. Garland, interim president
June 1, 2017–present – Linda Livingstone

(Note: While Rufus C. Burleson served as Baylor's president twice, he is counted only once in the presidential count. This makes Reddin Andrews the fifth president and Oscar Henry Cooper the sixth president. Additionally, interim presidents are not counted.)

Academics

Rankings

In the 2021 "Best Colleges" rankings by U.S. News & World Report, Baylor was ranked tied for 76th best "national university" in the U.S., tied at 31st for "Best Undergraduate Teaching", tied at 25th for "Most Innovative".

Baylor University is accredited by the Southern Association of Colleges and Schools.

Graduate rankings
Several Baylor graduate programs, including its law school, Hankamer School of Business and programs in the sciences and education are nationally ranked. According to the National Research Council (NRC), among those programs, Baylor's Graduate program in English was ranked first for Student Support and Outcomes by the National Research Council, and Baylor's Doctoral program in Sociology was ranked third nationally, based on criteria such as the percentage of students receiving full financial support, PhD completion percentage, median time to completion of degrees, and job placement rate.

Institutional organization

The university is divided into twelve degree-granting academic units.  Three of the units are designated as colleges, while eight others are designated as schools and one is a seminary. They are:
College of Arts & Sciences
Diana R. Garland School of Social Work
George W. Truett Theological Seminary
Graduate School
Hankamer School of Business
Honors College
Law School
Louise Herrington School of Nursing
Robbins College of Health and Human Sciences
School of Education
School of Engineering & Computer Science
School of Music

Student life

More than 16,000 students study at Baylor University, representing all 50 states, the District of Columbia and approximately 89 foreign countries. The university clubs and organizations provide each student with an opportunity to become engaged with an organization that shares his or her interests. Baylor University has a total undergraduate enrollment of 13,859, with a gender distribution of 42 percent male students and 58 percent female students. At Baylor, 36 percent of students live in college-owned, -operated, or -affiliated housing and 64 percent of students live off campus.

Clubs and organizations

Greek organizations

Approximately 14 percent of undergraduate men are members of fraternities, and 21 percent of undergraduate women are members of a sorority. There are four councils at Baylor. Most of the university's fraternities began as local fraternities, before affiliating with their national organizations in the late 1970s.

Non-IFC fraternities, social clubs, & non-NPC sororities

NPHC Fraternities and Sororities

LGBT organizations 
For many years, LGBT student organizations received no official recognition at Baylor University. The university had stated that the subject of sexual orientation was "too complex" for a student group to handle. However, in April of 2022, Baylor chartered an official LGBT organization called Prism that follows the University's "Statement on Human Sexuality."

Student activities
Every semester, students participate in various intramural sports. Students build teams within campus organizations, sororities/fraternities, residence halls, and personal friend groups. As of Fall 2022, Baylor offers these intramural sports:

Golden Wave Band

The Baylor University Golden Wave Band (BUGWB) is the halftime entertainment for Baylor football. The 340-member band attends every home football game and sometimes travels to away games. The band's name dates back to 1928 when, while on tour in West Texas, observers noted that the band members' gold uniforms looked like a giant "golden wave" sweeping over the landscape.

Noble NoZe Brotherhood
The Noble NoZe Brotherhood, an unofficial fraternal organization, was founded in 1924 to study the art of bridge construction in association with the BBA (Baylor Bridge Association). The brotherhood provides the university with unusual public pranks and satirical writings in its newspaper, The Rope. Members hide their identities to keep their actions anonymous.

Military programs
Baylor University has a strong history of military service dating back to before the Civil War and currently offers both Army and Air Force ROTC for students. Baylor graduates have served in every major military engagement in Texas history. Formal military instruction began on campus in 1888.

Baylor has had several famous military graduates such as Andrew Jackson Lummus, Jr., who fought and died at the Battle of Iwo Jima during World War II and received the Medal of Honor for his service. John Riley Kane also received the Medal of Honor for his service after flying 43 combat missions for a total of 250 combat hours in Europe, Africa and the Middle East. Kane's daring operations caused German intelligence reports to dub him "Killer Kane."

In July 1948, the Air Force and Baylor University partnered in the creation of Air Force ROTC Detachment 810 - one of the first detachments ever created. In 2008, Detachment 810 was awarded the Air Force ROTC Right Of Line Award as the No. 1 large detachment in the nation. The unit was additionally awarded the High Flight Award, recognizing it as one of the top four detachments in America. It has been named best in the AFROTC Southwest Region for 1996, 2003 and 2008.

Baylor runs several postgraduate and professional health sciences programs in partnership with the Army Medical Department headquartered in San Antonio. Programs offered include the Doctor of Physical Therapy, MHA, United States Army Graduate Program in Nursing Anesthesia (USAGPAN), and MHA/MBA (joint program).

Research and endowment

In 2005, the university was invited to join the Collider Detector at Fermilab (CDF) collaboration at the Fermi National Accelerator Laboratory in Batavia, Illinois. The project is one of the world's largest experimental physics collaborations. The following year, the university was classified as "Research University" with "High Research Activity". In 2021, the university was classified among "R1: Doctoral universities with very high research activity".

In October 2009, a group of state, county and city governments and organizations and higher educational institutions in Central Texas announced the creation of the Central Texas Technology and Research Park, and the park's first project, the Baylor Research and Innovation Collaborative (BRIC) to be housed in the former General Tire facility on South Loop Drive in Waco. Funding for the effort came from the state of Texas and Baylor University. Clifton Robinson (a member of Baylor's Board of Regents) donated the facility to the university to support the research collaborative.

Several former and present members of faculty at Baylor are or were prominent proponents of intelligent design, most notably philosopher William Dembski, now at Southwestern Baptist Theological Seminary, Christian philosopher Francis Beckwith and electrical engineer Robert J. Marks II.

The university's endowment passed $1 billion in 2007 and reached $1,055,478,000 on December 31, 2007. Even with the economic crisis of 2008, Baylor spokesperson Lori Fogleman reported that Baylor's endowment grew 5.1 percent in the fiscal year ending June 30, 2008; the National Association of College and University Business Officials estimated that during that same period, the median return for the top 25 percent of college endowments decreased by 2.2 percent. Fogleman cited the university's long-term investments and diversified holdings as the cause of the endowment's success. Despite a hired consulting firm's concerns that the troubled economy and disagreements within the Baylor community could hinder continued growth, the university's endowment exceeded $1.1 billion .

On March 4, 2010, "An anonymous longtime Baylor donor ... set up an estate provision that will benefit the school to the tune of an estimated $200 million. The gift will bolster Baylor's research on the issues of aging in multiple disciplines at the school." Citing the most recent data reported by the Chronicle of Higher Education, Baylor officials say the $200 million donation is the second-largest gift to a Texas college or university and ranks among the top 20 private gifts to higher education institutions in the country.

Athletics

Baylor student athletes participate in NCAA Division I as part of the Big 12 Conference. As of the 2021–22 school year, all teams are nicknamed "Bears". Women's teams had historically been known as "Lady Bears", but by the end of the 2010s almost all of these teams had dropped "Lady", with the last three holdouts of basketball, soccer, and volleyball following suit in fall 2021. In the 2011–2012 season, Baylor broke the NCAA record for most combined wins in the four major collegiate sports: baseball, football, and men's and women's basketball.

The university has won NCAA titles in 2004, 2005, 2012, 2019, and 2021. The men's tennis team defeated UCLA in the 2004 championship match to garner the Baylor's first title. One year later, the Baylor Lady Bears basketball team beat Michigan State in the championship game and was subsequently named as the only women's team to be nominated for a 2005 "Best Team" ESPY. In 2012, the Baylor Lady Bears basketball team beat the Notre Dame Fighting Irish in the NCAA National Championship; the first college basketball team to ever finish with a perfect 40–0 record. The Bears men's basketball team won the 2021 NCAA National Championship after beating the Gonzaga Bulldogs 86–70. It is the university's first men's national championship.

The Baylor men's basketball team advanced to the Elite Eight of the NCAA 'March Madness' Championship tournament in 2010, 2012, and 2021. Under the direction of head coach Scott Drew, Baylor achieved a record of 121-55 (.688) between the 2008–2012 seasons and reached post-season play in four of those years. Four former Baylor basketball players were drafted in the first or second round of the NBA draft in the 2011 and 2012 seasons:

Ekpe Udoh (first round)
Perry Jones III 
Quincy Acy (second round)
Quincy Miller (second round)

Year of the Bear
The Year of the Bear is the name given to the 2011–2012 year in Baylor Athletics. During this year, the Baylor Bears football team defeated Big 12 rival Oklahoma (No. 5 AP) for the first time ever, as well as future bitter Big 12 rival TCU (No. 14 AP), ending the season at 10-3 ranked at No. 12 (No. 13 AP). Junior quarterback Robert Griffin III gained recognition throughout the year and was awarded both the 2011 Heisman Trophy and National Player of the Year honors.

Meanwhile, the men's basketball team started with 17 straight wins en route to a 30–8 season (the best in school history), a berth in the NCAA Elite Eight (its second in three seasons) and a No. 10 final ranking. The women's basketball team won the program's second national title, becoming the first basketball program – men's or women's – to finish 40–0. Center Brittney Griner was named the National Player of the Year, while Coach Kim Mulkey was awarded National Coach of the Year. The baseball team won 49 games (one shy of its all-time best), including a Big 12-record 18-game conference winning streak and school-record 24-game winning streak. Although ranked at No. 1 for two weeks (a program first), the baseball team finished in the NCAA Super Regionals and a No. 9 ranking.

Baylor's four major programs (football, men's and women's basketball, and baseball) finished with an NCAA record 129 wins during the year (and an overall record of 129-28 for a winning percentage of .822) and Baylor was the only school to have all four programs ranked at the end of their respective seasons. The football and (men's and women's) basketball programs also set NCAA records with a combined 80 wins between them, including a stretch from November 1, 2011, to January 16, 2012, when the three programs had 40 consecutive wins between them.

Outside of the four major programs, Baylor was one of only two schools that had all 19 of its sponsored sports advance to the post season.

McLane Stadium

Following the 'Year of the Bear,' it was announced in July 2012 that a new $260 million football stadium to be called "McLane Stadium" would be constructed on the university's campus. The stadium was planned by architecture firm Populous, known for its design of Yankee Stadium in New York and Houston's Minute Maid Park. A partnership between Austin Commercial-Flintco LLC oversaw the project as its contractor.

From 1936 to 1949, the Baylor Bears home football games were played at Waco/Municipal Stadium. In 1950, the team moved to the newly constructed Floyd Casey Stadium (originally named Baylor Stadium), located four miles from campus with a seating capacity of up to 50,000 spectators. The stadium has been renovated several times, most notably in 1998 and 2005.

Mascots
Baylor's mascot is the American black bear. The university had two live bears on campus named Joy and Lady, each bearing the title of Judge in honor of the first live mascot. Joy died on July 18, 2022; the university has made plans to receive two rescue American black bear cubs in 2023 to continue Baylor’s tradition of having live bear mascots reside on campus. The school's costumed mascots are Bruiser and Marigold.

Although Baylor began intercollegiate athletic competition in the 1890s, students did not elect the university's mascot until 1914. The other two dozen nominees included the bald eagle and the bookworm. Three years later, the 107th Engineers, a U.S. Army troop stationed in Waco, gave Baylor its first live bear. The 107th Engineers had found the bear while traveling by train to Waco. After the troop left, the Baylor University Chamber of Commerce began caring for the animal. The organization still cares for the university's live bears.

One of the most famous Baylor mascots was "Big Joe" or "College Joe" in the 1930s. The bear (originally named Buckshot) was the pet of local businessman Herbert E. Mayr and was known to perform circus tricks and drink from a bottle at Mayr's business. The bear was housed at The Cotton Palace Zoo after it became too large to keep as a pet and destroyed the backseat of Mayr's car. Due to the expense of food, Mayr transferred responsibility for the bear to Waco attorney Woodie Zachery. It was later adopted by W.W. Boyd and soon began its 11 years as Baylor's mascot "College Joe." Following its death, the bear was stuffed and given a special display at the university.

The university's costumed mascot, Bruiser, was introduced at the beginning of the 1981–1982 basketball season. The mascot appears at football and basketball events, along with university pep rallies and community events. Bruiser also travels with the basketball team to games for the Big 12 Basketball Tournament, NIT and NCAA Tournaments.

Traditions
Baylor has many traditions that have developed since the university was founded. Some take the form of annual celebrations, while others are symbolized in memorials. The Baylor Chamber of Commerce is the oldest student organization on the campus that is responsible for most of the school's traditions.

Baylor Line

The Baylor Line is a tradition for new students that began in 1970. Freshmen embrace the spirit of Baylor by wearing special football jerseys and rushing the field before home football games. Each "Line Jersey" has a nickname chosen by the student and his or her intended year of graduation on the back. From its inception until 1994, only male students were allowed to run the Line. Before the football game on Saturday, October 28, 2017, alumnae who were not allowed to run in the Line were invited to join the Freshmen in the run.

Mass Meeting
The Thursday night of Homecoming Week, new Baylor students (Freshmen and Transfers) attend a mass meeting in Waco Hall where they learn about the Immortal Ten, the ten student athletes who died in a bus-train accident in Round Rock, Texas, on January 22, 1927. After the Mass Meeting, the freshmen class build a bonfire on Fountain Mall which often includes burning vigils of the homecoming football opponent's mascot created by the various on campus houses.

Homecoming
The nation's first homecoming celebrations originated at Baylor in November 1909. Not long after, the idea was adopted by the University of Illinois in 1910, the University of Missouri in 1911, and at universities throughout the U.S. in the years that followed. The Baylor Homecoming event began as a way to reconnect alumni with current students but has now grown to include a football game, bonfire, concerts, speeches, receptions, class reunions, pep rallies, and the nation's oldest and longest collegiate parade.

Immortal Ten
On January 22, 1927, a bus carrying the Baylor basketball team collided with the Sunshine Special train in Round Rock, Texas. Ten members of the traveling party were killed and many others were injured in the accident. The story of the Immortal Ten is told each year at Freshman Mass Meeting, where the names of the ten are called out. In 1996, the senior class provided initial funding to create an Immortal Ten statue on campus. Fundraising and planning for the statue continued over the ensuing years. Finally, on June 22, 2007, the statue sculpted by Bruce R. Greene was unveiled. The Immortal Ten memorial was officially dedicated during Homecoming on November 2, 2007, in Traditions Square.

Alma mater

Baylor's alma mater is "That Good Ol' Baylor Line." In 1906, a student penned humorous words to the tune of "In the Good Old Summer Time" and they became generally accepted among the student body as the school fight song. However, in 1931, Enid Eastland Markham, wife of music professor Robert Markham, felt the words were neither dignified enough nor representative of the total university, so she decided to write new lyrics, which were soon sanctioned as the official school song. The "Good Ol' Summer Time" tune was later arranged to fit Mrs. Markham's "Baylor Line" through the work of Jack Goode, Donald I. Moore and Charles F. Brown.

Notable alumni, faculty and staff
 

With more than 180,000 living alumni, Baylor is represented by notable individuals in an array of public and professional spheres.

Graduates acclaimed for their work in the arts include Pulitzer Prize-winning composer Steven Stucky, GMA Dove Award-winning composer Bruce Greer, Grammy Award-winning Christian recording artist Phil Driscoll, Christian recording artist David Crowder, Grammy-winning Gaither Vocal Band tenor David Phelps, screenwriter and director John Lee Hancock (with works including The Blind Side, nominated for the 2009 Academy Award for Best Picture), screenwriter Derek Haas (with works including 3:10 to Yuma and Wanted, both nominated for multiple Academy Awards), Emmy Award-nominated director Kevin Reynolds, Emmy-winning actress Angela Kinsey (the character of Angela Martin in NBC's The Office), Emmy-nominated actress Allison Tolman, Tony Award-nominated actress Elizabeth A. Davis, actress Carole Cook (a protégé of Lucille Ball), ventriloquist Jeff Dunham, and The Silence of the Lambs writer Thomas Harris.

Also alumni of the university are Chip and Joanna Gaines, who graduated in 1998 and 2001 respectively. They are the stars of the former HGTV show, Fixer Upper and are frequently involved in the Baylor community. In 2020, they left HGTV after being offered an opportunity to develop and star in their own network - Magnolia Network - which began airing in 2021 as part of the Discovery Family of Networks.

Alumni known for leadership in the private and public sectors include People Magazine co-founder Hal C. Wingo, The Weather Channel CFO Jerry Elliott, American Airlines CEO Thomas W. Horton, Western Refining CEO Paul Foster, Allbritton Communications Company (the parent company of Politico) founder Joe Allbritton, XTO Energy CEO Bob R. Simpson, chairman of the McLane Group and former owner of the Houston Astros Drayton McLane, Jr., Oracle Corporation CEO Mark Hurd, former chairman and CEO of Stanford Financial Group Allen Stanford, EXUSMED CEO and founder of Empowering Spirits Foundation A. Latham Staples, former mayor of San Antonio Phil Hardberger, former Governor of Texas Ann Richards, former Governor of Texas Mark Wells White Jr., former Federal Bureau of Investigation director William S. Sessions, and ninth president of Goucher College Judy Jolley Mohraz.

Professional athletes who graduated from the university include quarterback and 2011 Heisman Trophy-winner Robert Griffin III, Phoenix Mercury WNBA player Brittney Griner, four-time Olympic gold medalist Michael Johnson, and Baseball Hall of Fame inductee Ted Lyons.

Grammy–winning recording artist Willie Nelson, actor Austin Miller and Senator Rand Paul attended Baylor . Former United States Vice President John Nance Garner (Franklin D. Roosevelt President) received an honorary doctor of laws degree from Baylor in 1936. Actor and comedian Bill Cosby received an honorary doctor of humane letters degree from the university in 2003, which was rescinded in 2015.

For information on notable faculty, staff and other alumni, please see the List of Baylor University people.

Campus

See also
 SS Baylor Victory—ship namesake

Notes

References

External links

 
 Baylor Athletics website

 
1845 establishments in the Republic of Texas
Buildings and structures in Waco, Texas
Education in McLennan County, Texas
Educational institutions established in 1845
Private universities and colleges in Texas
Tourist attractions in Waco, Texas
Universities and colleges accredited by the Southern Association of Colleges and Schools
Universities and colleges affiliated with the Baptist General Convention of Texas
Universities and colleges affiliated with the Southern Baptist Convention
Articles containing video clips